The 1957–58 Boston Celtics season was the 12th season for the Celtics in the NBA. The Celtics made their second consecutive NBA Finals appearance, but were unable to defend their title, losing in a rematch of the Finals of the previous year to the St. Louis Hawks in six games.

Season standings

x = clinched playoff spot

Record vs. opponents

Game log

Playoffs

|- align="center" bgcolor="#ccffcc"
| 1
| March 19
| Philadelphia
| W 107–98
| Bob Cousy (29)
| Bill Russell (25)
| Bob Cousy (8)
| Boston Garden
| 1–0
|- align="center" bgcolor="#ccffcc"
| 2
| March 22
| @ Philadelphia
| W 109–87
| Bill Sharman (32)
| Bill Russell (28)
| Sharman, Cousy (4)
| Philadelphia Civic Center
| 2–0
|- align="center" bgcolor="#ccffcc"
| 3
| March 23
| Philadelphia
| W 106–92
| Bill Sharman (27)
| Bill Russell (40)
| Bob Cousy (14)
| Boston Garden
| 3–0
|- align="center" bgcolor="#ffcccc"
| 4
| March 26
| @ Philadelphia
| L 97–112
| Tom Heinsohn (20)
| Bill Russell (21)
| Cousy, Ramsey (5)
| Philadelphia Civic Center
| 3–1
|- align="center" bgcolor="#ccffcc"
| 5
| March 27
| Philadelphia
| W 93–88
| Heinsohn, Ramsey (22)
| Bill Russell (30)
| Bob Cousy (5)
| Boston Garden
| 4–1
|-

|- align="center" bgcolor="#ffcccc"
| 1
| March 29
| St. Louis
| L 102–104
| Bob Cousy (27)
| Bill Russell (29)
| Boston Garden3,652
| 0–1
|- align="center" bgcolor="#ccffcc"
| 2
| March 30
| St. Louis
| W 136–112
| Bob Cousy (25)
| Bill Russell (27)
| Boston Garden10,249
| 1–1
|- align="center" bgcolor="#ffcccc"
| 3
| April 2
| @ St. Louis
| L 108–111
| Frank Ramsey (29)
| Bill Russell (13)
| Kiel Auditorium10,148
| 1–2
|- align="center" bgcolor="#ccffcc"
| 4
| April 5
| @ St. Louis
| W 109–98
| Bob Cousy (24)
| three players tied (13)
| Kiel Auditorium10,216
| 2–2
|- align="center" bgcolor="#ffcccc"
| 5
| April 9
| St. Louis
| L 100–102
| Frank Ramsey (30)
| Tom Heinsohn (20)
| Boston Garden13,909
| 2–3
|- align="center" bgcolor="#ffcccc"
| 6
| April 12
| @ St. Louis
| L 109–110
| Bill Sharman (26)
| Arnie Risen (13)
| Kiel Auditorium10,216
| 2–4
|-

Awards and records
 Bill Russell, NBA Most Valuable Player Award
 Bob Cousy, All-NBA First Team
 Bill Sharman, All-NBA First Team
 Bill Russell, All-NBA Second Team

References

Boston Celtics seasons
Boston Celtics
Boston Celtics
Boston Celtics
1950s in Boston